The economy of Qatar is one of the highest in the world based on GDP per capita, ranking generally among the top ten richest countries on world rankings for 2015 and 2016 data compiled by the World Bank, the United Nations, and the International Monetary Fund (IMF). The country's economy has grown despite sanctions by its neighbors, Saudi Arabia and the United Arab Emirates.

Petroleum and natural gas are the cornerstones of Qatar's economy and account for more than 70% of total government revenue, more than 60% of gross domestic product, and roughly 85% of export earnings. Qatar has the world's third largest proven natural gas reserve and is the second-largest exporter of natural gas.

Energy sector

Before the emergence of petrol-based industry, Qatar was a poor pearl diving country. The exploration of oil and gas fields began in 1939. In 1973, oil production and revenues increased dramatically, moving Qatar out of the ranks of the world's poorest countries and providing it with one of the highest per capita incomes in the world.

Qatar's economy was in a downturn from 1982 to 1989. OPEC (Organization of Petroleum Exporting Countries) quotas on crude oil production, the lower price for oil, and the generally unpromising outlook on international markets reduced oil earnings. In turn, the Qatari government's spending plans had to be cut to match lower income. The resulting recessionary local business climate caused many firms to lay off expatriate staff. With the economy recovering in the 1990s, expatriate populations, particularly from Egypt and South Asia, have grown again.

Oil production will not long remain at peak levels of 500,000 barrels (80,000 m³) per day, as oil fields are projected to be mostly depleted by 2023. However, large natural gas reserves have been located off Qatar's northeast coast. These offshore gas fields also may contain significant oil and condensate reserves. For example, the state owned QatarEnergy corporation found two offshore oil fields in the 1960s. At the time production was too expensive. However, technological development led to production over 30 years later.

The gas condensate can be refined to usual oil products in specialised refineries. The costs are a bit higher but it is normal today for companies to use the gas condensate too. Oil offshore production in 2008 for PS-2 and PS-3 blocks was about 31.1 million barrels (84,995 b/d). Joint Ventures facilities (PS-1, ALK, K & A): Combined oil production from these three joint venture production facilities in 2008 was 57.4 million barrels (156,873 b/d). Like with gas fields there are more offshore blocks which need to be explored and could increase the oil output. So the 500,000 bpd peak and a depletion in 2023 is delayed. With higher oil prices it is expected that the offshore exploration of oil and/or natural gas fields will go on. Oil production in June 2016 seemed to be around 670,000 barrels per day, a bit down from February 2016 production of 692,000 barrels per day. Taking all liquids together Qatar is already far beyond a million barrels per day.

Qatar's proved reserves of gas are the third-largest in the world, exceeding 7000 km³ (250 trillion cubic feet). The economy was boosted in 1991 by completion of the $1.5-billion Phase I of North Field gas development. In 1996, the Qatargas project began exporting liquefied natural gas (LNG) to Japan. Further phases of North Field gas development costing billions of dollars are in various stages of planning and development.

Qatar's heavy industrial projects, all based in Umm Said, include a refinery with a 50,000 barrels (8,000 m³) per day capacity, a fertilizer plant for urea and ammonia, a steel plant, and a petrochemical plant. All these industries use gas for fuel. Most are joint ventures between European and Japanese firms and the state-owned QatarEnergy corporation (formerly QGPC). The U.S. is the major equipment supplier for Qatar's oil and gas industry, and U.S. companies are playing a major role in North Field gas development.
890-
Qatar pursues a vigorous program of "Qatarization", under which all joint venture industries and government departments strive to move Qatari nationals into positions of greater authority. Growing numbers of foreign-educated Qataris, including many educated in the U.S., are returning home to assume key positions formerly occupied by expatriates. In order to control the influx of expatriate workers, Qatar has tightened the administration of its foreign manpower programs over the past several years. Security is the principal basis for Qatar's strict entry and immigration rules and regulations.

Industry
The government considers industry to be an integral part of its plan to diversify the economy and maximize its huge natural gas reserves, which serve as the primary feed stock for the sector. Accordingly, careful planning has gone into industrial development. With an eye towards exports, development has been clustered around the ports of Ras Laffan Industrial City and Mesaieed Industrial Area, which are key centers of energy. The result has seen considerable growth over the years. Industries Qatar (IQ), a producer of petrochemicals, fertilizers and steel, is a regional powerhouse, surpassed only in size by Saudi Basic Industries Corporation (SABIC), the Middle East's largest chemical producer. In 2007 the manufacturing sector made the third-largest contribution to GDP among non-oil and gas sectors, equivalent to about 7.5% of GDP. Industry in Qatar is regulated by the Ministry of Business and Trade.

Petrochemicals and fertilizers supply make up a large portion of the industrial base, along with steel and other construction materials, through Qatar Steel and Qatar Primary Material Company (QPMC). Indeed, over the past few years, demand for construction materials experienced a major surge as the development boom swept the Persian Gulf region. But the global financial crisis has put a significant dent in demand in the region, as project credit lines dry up and investor sentiment remains cautious. The crisis has in fact impacted the whole of the industrial sector – IQ saw its net profit drop in the fourth quarter of 2008 more than 90% over the same period the previous year. But in relative terms, the sector has fared better than most and IQ still managed to post an annual profit of $2bn. Large profit chunks from years past have been channeled into capital investments, which should help the sector ride out the storm. IQ, for example, is pushing several major expansion projects, worth almost $6bn, ahead. Qatar is expected to be one of the fastest growing economies in 2009 – the hope is it will be enough to keep the industrial sector on an upward trajectory.

Financial sector

The Qatari banking sector managed to escape the direct impact of the global subprime fallout, but was not altogether unscathed by its aftershocks. Overall, it was the best performing of the Gulf Cooperation Council markets in the last quarter of 2008 and most banks posted substantial profits for 2008. But the sector is also facing issues of liquidity, declining customer confidence and a forced reluctance to lend. In a bid to strengthen the banks’ positions, the Qatar Investment Authority (QIA) announced in early 2009 that it was willing to take a 10-20% stake in any interested local listed banks by way of a capital injection, although this was later reduced to 5% stakes and an additional 5% at the end of 2009.

The Qatari government also announced in March 2009 that it was planning to buy the investment portfolio of the banks in the hope this would encourage them to continue lending. Cautious sector sentiment has also been compounded by the Qatar Central Bank's (QCB's) lending restrictions, which demand a loan-to-deposit ratio of 90%. Given the high level of integration between Qatar's economy and the Persian Gulf region, as well as the wider world, a slowdown in business and banking activity seemed inevitable. Nevertheless, Qatar's banking sector has been faring relatively well, considering the strife experienced in other countries, and insiders are confident that activity will return to its previous brisk pace in the second half of 2009 as confidence slowly rebuilds around the globe.

The International Monetary Fund in its spring assessment 2019 said that Qatar has "successfully absorbed the shocks" of the blockade imposed in 2017 and the dropped oil prices from 2014 to 2016. S&P Global had marked Qatar's outlook to negative in 2017, but changed it to stable in 2019.

In August 2019, Qatar Central Bank stated that the country's economic growth will see a boost over the next two years amid expectations of stable oil prices and continued strong exports. The GDP is expected to grow at an average rate of 2.8% between 2018 and 2020, with the budget surplus falling to 4.35 billion riyals in 2019, from a surplus of 15.1 billion riyals in 2018.

Islamic finance

The Islamic finance sector enjoyed increased activity in 2008 and is expected to continue to grow into 2009 as more sophisticated financial instruments spark the interest of investors. In addition to Islamic banks, such as Qatar Islamic Bank (QIB), Qatar International Islamic Bank (QIIB) and newcomer Masraf Al Rayyan, conventional banks have also been entering the sharia-compliant sector and are coming to view an Islamic subsidiary as a virtual necessity in order to maintain market standing. Islamic banks currently take the lion's share of sharia-compliant business, though the conventional banks are working hard to take a greater share of market activity. Both Islamic banks and Islamic subsidiaries did remarkably well in the first three quarters of 2008, during which overall financing activity increased by 70.6% compared to the same period in the previous year. The global financial crisis slowed this growth though. Poor market conditions have contributed to a marked slowdown of Islamic bond, or sukuk, activity in 2008 throughout the Persian Gulf. But other segments, such as Islamic insurance, or takaful, have not seen a similar downturn. Overall, challenges to further growth remain, including a lack of qualified staff to meet the growing demand for sharia-compliant banking services.

Capital market
The stock market capitalisation of listed companies in Qatar was valued at $95,487 million in 2007 by the World Bank. As 2008 drew to a close, no capital markets around the globe, including Qatar's, were immune to the effects of the sub-prime fallout. That said, there is considerable optimism that Qatar's bourse, the Doha Securities Market (DSM), will remain relatively resilient to the ongoing international turbulence. It has followed the same peak-trough trajectory as many others around the globe, hitting record highs in mid-2008, before diving in late 2008 and early 2009. Between December 2006 and July 2008 the DSM Index rose about 117% before the global financial crisis wiped out most of these gains. In the first few months of 2009, the DSM lost about 40% of its value. In an effort to stave off further losses, the government announced in February 2009 that it would step in to buy up shares of troubled banks amounting to about 10% of the market's capitalisation. The move improved investor optimism and is hoped to prevent the market from falling further. The proposal to create a single unified regulator as early as 2010 to oversee all banking and financial services is viewed as another promising development that will transform the financial sector for the better.

Travel and tourism

Under the ambitious five-year development plan of the Qatar Tourism and Exhibitions Authority (QTEA), the government aimed to boost the number of visitors from 964,000 as of 2007 to 1.5m by 2010. The funding required to meet this goal was present in sufficient amounts; in 2008 the state allocated some $17bn for tourism development through 2014, most of which was allocated towards hotels, exhibition space and infrastructure. In order to keep up with a rising number of visitors, the government set a goal of increasing hotel capacity 400% by 2012. In addition to financial support, the government has also worked to ease business regulations in a bid to increase private sector activity. A major aspect of expansion plans is the Hamad International Airport, which has the capacity to handle up to 24m passengers.

Qatar Airways is an airline owned by the Qatar government and was founded in 1993. It travels to over a hundred destinations.

Other niche tourism segments receiving special focus include cultural tourism on the back of the high publicity opening of Doha's Museum of Islamic Art, and sports tourism, initially spurred by the Asian Games, to which Qatar played host in 2006. Qatar hosted the 2022 FIFA World cup,

Transport

With a fast-expanding population and substantial economic growth over the past decade, a reliable and extensive transportation network is becoming increasingly necessary within Qatar. So far the government, the primary transport developer, has done well in terms of keeping up with demand for new transportation options. In 2008 the Public Works Authority (Ashghal), one of the bodies that oversees infrastructure development, underwent a major reorganisation in order to streamline and modernise the authority in preparation for major project expansions across all segments in the near future. Ashghal works in tandem with the Urban Planning and Development Authority (UPDA), the body that designed the transportation master plan, instituted in March 2006 and running to 2025.

As driving is the primary mode of transport in Qatar, the road network is a major focus of the plan. Project highlights in this segment include the multibillion-dollar Doha Expressway and the Qatar Bahrain Causeway, which will connect Qatar to Bahrain and Saudi Arabia and is considered a milestone in regional interconnectivity. Mass-transit options, such as a Doha metro, light-rail system and more extensive bus networks, are also under development to ease road congestion. In addition, the railway system is being significantly expanded and could eventually form an integral part of a GCC-wide network linking all of the six member states. The airport, too, is expanding capacity to keep up with rising visitor numbers. The New Doha International Airport is one of the largest projects in Qatar today and will boast a capacity of 50m passengers upon completion in 2015. Finally, port infrastructure is seen as an integral part of Qatar's economic development as it focuses on LNG and industrial exports. The port at Mesaieed is undergoing expansion. While the financial crisis may present challenges to infrastructure development, once all projects are completed Qatar will have one of the most advanced and modern transport infrastructures in the region.

Macro-economic trend
Qatar is now the richest country in the world, on a per person basis. Current GDP per capita registered a world record-breaking peak growth of 1,156% in the 70s. This became quickly unsustainable and Qatar's current GDP per capita contracted 53% in the 80s. But rising global oil demand helped current GDP per capita to expand 94% in the 90s. Despite efforts to promote the non-hydrocarbon sectors and diversify the economy from hydrocarbons to knowledge-based sectors, the oil and gas sector has consistently contributed to at least 80 percent of the government of Qatar’s total revenues since 2014, as well as 90 percent of Qatar’s total exports.

In 2020 GDP PPP ~260 billion dollars.

This table is of Qatar's gross domestic product at market prices as estimated by the International Monetary Fund with figures in millions of Qatari Rials.

For purchasing power parity comparisons only, the US Dollar is exchanged at 3.67 Qatari Riyals. Mean wages were $59.99 per man-hour in 2009.

In February 2012, the International Bank of Qatar reported that GDP grew by 19.9% in 2011, but estimated that 2012 growth would slow to 9.8%

The following table shows the main economic indicators in 1980–2017. Inflation below 2% is in green.

According to the International Monetary Fund, Qatar's economic performance improved in 2018 despite the economic embargo. The GDP growth is expected to increase to 2.6% in 2019 from 2.2% in 2018.

References
12910128/Economic_Diversification_in_the_Arab_Gulf_States
https://www.academia.edu/12910128/Economic_Diversification_in_the_Arab_Gulf_States
https://www.academia.edu/32219974/Economic_Inclination_of_Qatar_Towards_Asian_Region_With_Special_Reference_To_India

External links
 
 map of oil and gas infrastructure in Qatar
 Tariffs applied by Qatar as provided by ITC's Market Access Map, an online database of customs tariffs and market requirements

 
Qatar
Economy of the Arab League
Petroleum industry in Qatar